William Arnot  may refer to:

Sir William Arnot, 7th Baronet, of the Arnot baronets
Sir William Arnot, 9th Baronet, of the Arnot baronets
William Arnot (minister) (1808–1875) Scottish minister

See also
William Arnott (disambiguation)